Arie Radler is a former Israeli footballer and manager.

Honours

As a Player
Israeli championships
Winner (5): 1958–59, 1959–60, 1960–61, 1961–62, 1962–63
Runner-up (3): 1955–56, 1956–57, 1957–58
State Cup
Winner (1): 1957
Runner-up (2): 1959, 1961
Israeli Supercup
Winner (1): 1962
Runner-up (1): 1957

As a Manager
Israeli championships
Winner (1): 1973–74
Runner-up (1): 1971–72
Liga Alef
Runner-up (1): 1989–90

References

1937 births
Living people
Israeli footballers
Israeli football managers
Hapoel Ramat Gan F.C. players
Hapoel Petah Tikva F.C. players
Hapoel Kfar Saba F.C. players
Hapoel Kfar Saba F.C. managers
Maccabi Petah Tikva F.C. managers
Bnei Yehuda Tel Aviv F.C. managers
Beitar Jerusalem F.C. managers
Maccabi Netanya F.C. managers
Hapoel Petah Tikva F.C. managers
Hapoel Hadera F.C. managers
Maccabi Jaffa F.C. managers
Hakoah Ramat Gan F.C. managers
Beitar Tel Aviv F.C. managers
Maccabi Ironi Ashdod F.C. managers
Association football defenders